Raphaël Stacchiotti (born 9 March 1992 in Luxembourg City) is a Luxembourgish swimmer, who specialized in the freestyle and individual medley events. He is a four-time Olympian (2008, 2012, 2016 and 2020), a multiple-time Luxembourgian record holder in all freestyle and medley events, and a double European junior champion. Stacchiotti also holds numerous meet records and collects a total of 49 medals (40 golds, seven silvers, and two bronzes) from the Games of the Small States of Europe (2007, 2009, 2011, 2013, 2015, 2017 and 2019). At the 2008 Summer Olympics, Stacchiotti became the youngest athlete (aged 16) to be chosen by the Luxembourg squad, and was given the honor of carrying the nation's flag in the opening ceremony.

Career

International career
Stacchiotti made his official debut, as Luxembourg's youngest athlete in history (aged 16) at the 2008 Summer Olympics in Beijing, where he was given the honour of carrying the nation's flag in the opening ceremony. He qualified for the men's 200 m freestyle by eclipsing a FINA B-cut of 1:50.30 from the FINA World Junior Championships in Monterrey, Mexico. Stacchiotti challenged seven other swimmers in heat four, including India's 16-year-old Virdhawal Khade and Czech Republic's three-time Olympian Květoslav Svoboda. He rounded out the field to last place by 0.15 of a second behind Khade in 1:52.01. Stacchiotti failed to advance into the semifinals, as he placed forty-ninth overall out of 58 swimmers in the prelims.

In 2009, Stacchiotti earned his first ever career gold medal in the 200 m individual medley (2:02.56) at the European Junior Championships in Prague, Czech Republic. Two weeks later, at the FINA World Championships in Rome, Italy, Stacchiotti placed forty-seventh in the 200 m individual medley (2:05.51), thirty-fifth in the 400 m individual medley (4:26.63), and forty-fifth in the 200 m freestyle (1:49.61, a Luxembourgish record).

At the 2010 European Junior Swimming Championships in Helsinki, Finland, Stacchiotti stormed home on the final lap to defend his 200 m individual medley title in 2:02.52, holding off Great Britain's Ieuan Lloyd by two-tenths of a second (0.20). He also collected a silver medal in the 400 m individual medley at 4:21.28.

At the 2011 FINA World Championships in Shanghai, Stacchiotti failed to reach the semifinals in any of his individual events, finishing twentieth each in the 200 m individual medley (2:00.87) and 400 m individual medley (4:20.64), both with a personal textile best and a new Luxembourgish record.

2012 Summer Olympics

Stacchiotti competed in an individual medley double, as a 20-year-old, at the 2012 Summer Olympics in London. He achieved Olympic invitation times (formerly a FINA B-standard) of 2:00.22 (200 m individual medley) and 4:18.98 (400 m individual medley) from the European Long Course Meet in Luxembourg City.

On the first day of the Games, Stacchiotti placed eighteenth in the 400 m individual medley. Swimming in heat two, he blasted a new Luxembourgian record of 4:17.20, but came up short in second place by nearly half a second (0.50) behind Belgium's Ward Bauwens. Four days later, in the 200 m individual medley, Stacchiotti registered a time of 2:00.38, just a small fraction outside his own record, but missed the semifinals by a tenth of a second (0.10) behind Canada's Andrew Ford. Ending up with frustration and disbelief, Stacchiotti failed in what was to be his most surprising moment of all time: "It's my fault. I completely lost my rhythm during the breaststroke”.

Personal bests
.

References

External links
 
 
 

1992 births
Living people
Luxembourgian male swimmers
Luxembourgian male freestyle swimmers
Male medley swimmers
Olympic swimmers of Luxembourg
Swimmers at the 2008 Summer Olympics
Swimmers at the 2010 Summer Youth Olympics
Swimmers at the 2012 Summer Olympics
Swimmers at the 2016 Summer Olympics
Swimmers at the 2020 Summer Olympics
Sportspeople from Luxembourg City